Calvary Cemetery is a cemetery located in Tacoma, Washington. It is the only Catholic cemetery in Tacoma. Calvary Cemetery was incorporated in October, 1905. It was founded because Pioneer Catholic Cemetery was filling up and a new cemetery was needed. Prior to 1905, the cemetery was known as Rigney Cemetery.

Persons of note buried here are Pip Koehler, a baseball player, and Dorothy Olsen, who was a member of the Women Airforce Service Pilots which was established in World War II and LaVerne H. Bates, namesake of Bates Technical College. The cemetery contains one British Commonwealth war grave, of a Royal Canadian Air Force officer of World War II.

References

Cemeteries in Washington (state)
Roman Catholic cemeteries in the United States
Protected areas of Pierce County, Washington
Geography of Tacoma, Washington